The Carnegie Public Library in Rocky Ford, Colorado is a Carnegie library built in 1908.  It was listed on the National Register of Historic Places in 1995.

It was designed by La Junta, Colorado architect Walter Dubree in Classical Revival style.  It was the first building in Rocky Ford of that style.

References

Carnegie libraries in Colorado
Libraries in Colorado
National Register of Historic Places in Otero County, Colorado
Neoclassical architecture in Colorado
Library buildings completed in 1908